The Singapore Armed Forces Long Service and Good Conduct (20 Years) Medal is a decoration awarded to a member of the Singapore Armed Forces (SAF) (regardless of regular or NSmen status) who has completed 20 years of continuous service.

A clasp is awarded for an additional 10 years of service, for a total of 30 years.

Description

 The ribbon is brown, with two thick central white stripes and three sets of four thin white stripes surrounding them.

Service medals
In the SAF, the medals for service are:
  5 years - Singapore Armed Forces Good Service Medal
 10 years - Singapore Armed Forces Long Service and Good Conduct (10 Years) Medal
 15 years - Singapore Armed Forces Long Service and Good Conduct (10 Years) Medal with 15 year clasp
 20 years - Singapore Armed Forces Long Service and Good Conduct (20 Years) Medal
 25 years - Long Service Medal (Military)
 30 years - Singapore Armed Forces Long Service and Good Conduct (20 Years) Medal with 30 year clasp

References
Singapore MINDEF Factsheet: Review of SAF medals
Singaporean Army Medals Factsheet

See also
 Singaporean orders and decorations

Military awards and decorations of Singapore
Long service medals